Robert Norris Bowden (August 13, 1926 – April 9, 1991) was a Canadian figure skater.

Born in Toronto, Ontario, Bowden won championships in every division of Canadian figure skating. He was national men's champion as a junior and senior (1947), national pairs (junior and senior), dance (1952), waltz, and 10-step champion with Frances Dafoe, and national fours champion.

Bowden and Dafoe captured four Canadian titles (1952, 1953, 1954, 1955) and two world championships (1954, 1955). They won the silver medal at the 1956 Winter Olympics in Cortina d'Ampezzo, Italy, where Bowden was Canada's flag bearer in the opening ceremonies. Norris and his partner were the first pair skaters to do the twist lift, throw jump, ‘leap of faith’ and overhead lasso. It was because of these two that some of the rules in pairs skating were changed.

Outside skating, Bowden graduated with an MBA and worked in the life insurance industry. He was founding president of the Centennial Nursery School for Retarded Children (now the Centennial Infant and Child Centre) in Toronto.

He has been inducted into Canada's Sports Hall of Fame (1955), the Canadian Olympic Hall of Fame (1958), and the Skate Canada Hall of Fame (1993).

Results
men's singles

 J. = Junior level

(pairs with Frances Dafoe)

(ice dance with Frances Dafoe)

References

Navigation

1926 births
1991 deaths
Figure skaters from Toronto
Canadian male single skaters
Canadian male pair skaters
Canadian male ice dancers
Figure skaters at the 1952 Winter Olympics
Figure skaters at the 1956 Winter Olympics
Olympic figure skaters of Canada
Olympic silver medalists for Canada
Olympic medalists in figure skating
World Figure Skating Championships medalists
Medalists at the 1956 Winter Olympics
20th-century Canadian people